Judson Taylor (February 25, 1932August 6, 2008) was an American actor, television director, and television producer.

Early years
Born in New York City, Taylor graduated from the University of California, Berkeley.

Career
Taylor is perhaps best known for his directorial work on 1960s television shows such as Star Trek, Dr. Kildare, and The Man from U.N.C.L.E.. In the early 2000s, he directed several episodes of Law and Order: Special Victims Unit. Taylor also directed more than 40 made-for-TV movies, including the award-winning Tail Gunner Joe and Foxfire, and the final film appearances of both Susan Hayward in Say Goodbye, Maggie Cole (1972)) and David Janssen in City in Fear (1980)).

In the late 1950s and early 1960s, before becoming an established director, Taylor worked as an actor. He had a recurring role on Dr. Kildare as "Dr. Gerson". He appeared in several episodes of The Fugitive and Twelve O'Clock High playing different characters. Other TV programs in which he had small roles included Gunsmoke, Men of Annapolis, and Wagon Train. He also played the part of Goff, one of three Americans, in the feature film The Great Escape and subsequently directed a made-for-TV sequel to the film titled The Great Escape II: The Untold Story (1988) starring Christopher Reeve. Two years later, he directed a television miniseries based on Ernest Hemingway's The Old Man and the Sea (1990 miniseries) starring Anthony Quinn in the role originally portrayed by Spencer Tracy in the earlier theatrical version.

Taylor was vice president of the Directors Guild of America from 1977 to 1981 and president from 1981 to 1983.

He died in New York City in 2008, following a long illness.

Selected filmography

Actor
 Attack! (1956 World War II film) – Pvt. Jacob R. Abramowitz - radioman
 General Electric Theater (1 episode, 1957) – Bellboy
 The Garment Jungle (1957) – Latzo (uncredited)
 Gunsmoke (1 episode, 1957) – Ed Thorpe
 Harbormaster (1 episode, 1957) – Pete
 Men of Annapolis (2 episodes, 1957-1958) – Red Magruder / Weaver
 The Adventures of Rin Tin Tin (1 episode, 1959) – Charlie Buffalo
 Follow the Sun (1 episode, 1961) – Peter
 Wagon Train (1 episode, 1961) – Arthur
 Dr. Kildare (16 episodes, 1961–1965) – Dr. Thomas Gerson
 The Interns (1962) – Dr. Van Wyck (uncredited)
 The Great Escape (1963) – 2nd Lieutenant Goff
 The Fugitive (5 episodes, 1963–1965) – Sergeant Rainey / Toby Weems / Joey / Floyd (final television appearance)
 12 O'Clock High (3 episodes, 1964–1965) – Lieutenant Morgan / Sergeant Loren / Lieutenant Harold Zimmerman

Director

TV series

 Dr. Kildare (10 episodes, 1965)
 The Man from U.N.C.L.E. (1 episode, 1965)
 A Man Called Shenandoah (6 episodes, 1965–1966)
 Ben Casey (1 episode, 1966)
 Shane (1 episode, 1966)
 The Girl from U.N.C.L.E. (1 episode, 1966)
 Felony Squad (1 episode, 1966)
 The Fugitive (1 episode, 1966)
 Captain Nice (1 episode, 1967)
 T.H.E. Cat (1 episode, 1967)
 The Second Hundred Years (1 episode, 1967)
 The Guns of Will Sonnett (1 episode, 1968)
 Judd, for the Defense (1 episode, 1968)
 Star Trek (5 episodes, 1968–1969)

 Then Came Bronson (8 episodes, 1969–1970)
 The Bold Ones: The New Doctors (Unknown episodes, 1969)
 Love, American Style (2 episodes, 1969)
 The Young Lawyers (Unknown episodes, 1970)
 The Interns (1 episode, 1971)
 Longstreet (1 episode, 1971)
 Mannix (1 episode, 1971)
 The Rookies (1 episode, 1972)
 Hawkins (4 episodes, 1973–1974)
 Sara (1 episode, 1976)
 Lou Grant (1 episode, 1977)
 Kung Fu: The Legend Continues (1 episode, 1993)
 Law & Order: Special Victims Unit (5 episodes, 2000–2004)

TV movies

 Fade In (1968) (as Alan Smithee)
 Weekend of Terror (1970)
 Suddenly Single (1970)
 Revenge! (1971 American TV movie)
 Say Goodbye, Maggie Cole (1972) (last film appearance of Susan Hayward)
 Egan (1973)
 Winter Kill (1974)
 The Disappearance of Flight 412 (1974)
 Search for the Gods (1975)
 Return to Earth (1976)
 Woman of the Year (1976 TV movie)
 Mary White (1977)
 Tail Gunner Joe (1977)
 Christmas Miracle in Caufield, U.S.A. (1977) (aka The Christmas Coal Mine Miracle)
 The Last Tenant (1978)
 Lovey: A Circle of Children, Part II (1978)
 Flesh and Blood (1979)
 City in Fear (1980) (as Alan Smithee) (last film appearance of David Janssen)
 Act of Love (1980)

 Incident at Crestridge (1981)
 A Question of Honor (1982)
 Packin' It In (1983)
 License to Kill (1984)
 Out of the Darkness (1985)
 Broken Vows (1987)
 Foxfire (1987)
 Doubletake (1988)
 The Great Escape II: The Untold Story (1988)
 The Old Man and the Sea (1990)
 Murder Times Seven (1990)
 Kaleidoscope (1990)
 In My Daughter's Name (1992)
 Prophet of Evil: The Ervil LeBaron Story (1993)
 Guinevere (1994)
 Secrets (1995)
 A Holiday to Remember (1995)
 Clover (1997)

Producer
 Return to Earth (1976)
 Woman of the Year (1976)
 Incident at Crestridge (1981)

Writer
 Bob Hope Presents the Chrysler Theatre (1 episode, 1965)

Awards and nominations

References

External links

1932 births
2008 deaths
Presidents of the Directors Guild of America
American television directors
Television producers from New York City
American television writers
American male television writers
American male television actors
American male film actors
Male actors from New York City
Film directors from New York City
Screenwriters from New York (state)
20th-century American male actors
20th-century American screenwriters
20th-century American male writers